Douglas Foo Peow Yong  (born 1969) is a Singaporean business executive and former Nominated Member of Parliament (NMP). He is the founder and chairman of Sakae Holdings Ltd; as well as Singapore’s Non Resident High Commissioner to Tanzania and appointed representative to the ASEAN Business Advisory Council. He is also the President of the Singapore Manufacturing Federation (SMF), Vice-President of the Singapore National Employers’ Federation (SNEF) and Vice-Chairman of the Singapore Business Federation (SBF).

Early life 
Foo was born in Singapore in 1969 and has two younger sisters Lena and Lilian. His father, Foo Kia Hee, was an immigrant from Hainan, China and worked as a mechanical and electrical consultant.

Education 
Foo received his primary education at Red Swastika School, secondary education at Dunman High School and pre-university education at Victoria Junior College.

Foo had originally planned to study Engineering at the Nanyang Technological University (NTU), but decided to switch course to Business administration. However, he did not qualify for NTU's business school, and thus travelled to Australia to study at the Royal Melbourne Institute of Technology. He graduated in 1994 with a Bachelor's degree in business administration (finance).

Foo attended the Eisenhower Fellowships in 2013.

Career

Early career 
Before his National service enlistment, he worked various jobs including taking turbine readings for engineers at the Seraya Power Plant, relief teaching at Pin Yi Secondary School and as a baker at Délifrance.

After finishing his university education in Australia, Foo returned to Singapore and joined Tokyu Group, where he worked as a marketing executive in the real estate arm of the company. While working there, one of his Japanese clients interested him in forming a garment manufacturing and trading business which would manufacture garments in India and sell them in Japan. Despite being inexperienced in the field, Foo invested  in the idea and formed Apex-Pal International Pte Ltd in 1996. The company's office was based in International Plaza and had a factory in India with 50 workers and reconditioned sewing machine from Taiwan. The business was profitable within its first year.

Sakae Sushi 
Following the success of his company's venture, Foo was interested in expanding and diversifying the company. He recognised that Singaporeans were increasingly health conscious about their food. He saw a business opportunity in providing Japanese food at prices more affordable to the masses as Japanese food, although healthy, was rather expensive at the time. He travelled to Japan and Hong Kong to explore the concept of Conveyor belt sushi, before opening the first outlet of Sakae Sushi at OUB Centre at Raffles Place in September 1997 during the 1997 Asian financial crisis. The business was successful, and it allowed the company to open numerous Sakae Sushi outlets around the world. The company has since also developed various other Food and Beverage brands.

After becoming publicly listed on the Singapore Exchange on 16 July 2003, the company was renamed to Apex-Pal International Ltd, and was subsequently renamed to Sakae Holdings Ltd on 4 May 2010.

Foo served as the Chairman and Chief Executive Officer (CEO) of the company until 1 March 2014 when his sister Lilian Foo took over as the CEO.

SMF 
During SMF's Annual General Meeting on 19 September 2014, it was announced that Foo would be the President of SMF from 19 October 2014, succeeding George Huang.

SBF 
Foo joined the SBF Council in 2014 as a member after having previously served on the SBF-led SME Committee. He was appointed as Vice-Chairman of SBF in June 2018.

NMP 
Foo was selected as an NMP on 17 September 2018 and received his instrument of appointment from President Halimah Yacob on 26 September 2018. He was sworn in with eight other NMPs during the following Parliament sitting on 1 October 2018. He served during the second session of 13th Parliament of Singapore, which commenced on 7 May 2018.

Foo ceased to be a Member of Parliament following the dissolution of Parliament on 23 June 2020 prior to the 2020 Singaporean general election.

Personal life 
Foo is married to Koh Yen Khoon, who he met in 1988 while working at a Délifrance cafe. He has 4 sons.

Honours 

 :
 Pingat Bakti Masyarakat  (Public Service Medal) (2007)
 Bintang Bakti Masyarakat  (Public Service Star) (2013)
 :
 Seri Pangeran Temenggong Sultan Mahmud Badaruddin III  (conferred by the Sultan of Palembang Darussalam Sultan Mahmud Badaruddin III, Prabu Diraja in 2016)

References 

Singaporean Nominated Members of Parliament
1969 births
Victoria Junior College alumni
Recipients of the Pingat Bakti Masyarakat
Singaporean chairpersons of corporations
Singaporean people of Chinese descent
Living people
Dunman High School alumni
RMIT University alumni
Recipients of the Bintang Bakti Masyarakat
Singapore Business Federation